Nowe Brusno  (Nove Brusno) is a village in the administrative district of Gmina Horyniec-Zdrój, within Lubaczów County, Subcarpathian Voivodeship, in south-eastern Poland, where it is close to the border with Ukraine.

References

Nowe Brusno